Finality, in law, is the concept that certain disputes must achieve a resolution from which no further appeal may be taken, and from which no collateral proceedings may be permitted to disturb that resolution. For example, in some jurisdictions, those convicted of a crime may not sue their defence attorney for incompetence or legal malpractice if the civil lawsuit would call into question the finality of the criminal conviction.

Finality is considered to be important because otherwise, there would be no certainty as to the meaning of the law, or the outcome of any legal process. The principle is an aspect of the separation of powers, that being a distinction between the executive and the judicial power. That concept was defined in Kable v Director of Public Prosecutions (NSW) in which a court stated that unless orders were valid until set aside, "the exercise of judicial power could yield no adjudication of right and liability to which immediate effect could be given". 

The importance of finality is the source of the concept of res judicata: the decisions of one court are settled law and may not be retried in another case brought in a different court.

References

Legal procedure
Legal doctrines and principles